This is a list of Belgian television related events from 1981.

Events
7 March - Emily Starr is selected to represent Belgium at the 1981 Eurovision Song Contest with her song "Samson". She is selected to be the twenty-sixth Belgian Eurovision entry during Eurosong held at the Amerikaans Theater in Brussels.

Debuts
1 November - Tik Tak (1981-1991)

Television shows

Ending this year

Births
17 April - Thomas Vanderveken, TV host
22 May - Louis Talpe, actor
21 August - Cathérine Kools actress
17 September - Cara Van der Auwera, actress & TV host
7 October - Tess Goossens, singer & TV host

Deaths